Joana Benedek (born Roxana Joana Benedek Godeanu on January 21, 1972) is a Romanian-born Mexican actress.

She left her native land in search of work. She first moved to Venezuela before moving to Mexico. In Caracas she continued to study, but later left her studies to work as a model and playing several telenovela characters. In 1997 she signed a contract with a prestigious cosmetics company in New York City. During her stay in the city, she decided to study acting in the Academy of Susan Grace.

She was later discovered by a Mexican producer, which began her career as an actress in telenovelas. Sirena, Amigas y Rivales, and Angela are some of the melodramas in which the actress has participated.

Filmography

Awards and nominations

Premios TVyNovelas

References

External links

1972 births
Living people
Romanian television actresses
Mexican telenovela actresses
Mexican television actresses
Mexican female models
Actresses from Bucharest
20th-century Mexican actresses
21st-century Mexican actresses
Naturalized citizens of Mexico
Romanian emigrants to Mexico
Romanian expatriates in Venezuela